The Chester F. Carlson Center for Imaging Science (CIS) is the Rochester Institute of Technology's (RIT) research and education center for imaging.

References

Rochester Institute of Technology